Drowning Fork is a stream in the U.S. state of Illinois. It was so named on account of two soldiers who drowned there while crossing at high water.

See also
List of rivers of Illinois

References

Rivers of McDonough County, Illinois
Rivers of Warren County, Illinois
Rivers of Illinois